Brutus and Portia is a painting in tempera on panel of  by Ercole de' Roberti in the Kimbell Art Museum in Fort Worth, Texas, which acquired it in 1986. It shows Caesar's assassin Marcus Junius Brutus and his wife Porcia.

This panel, Brutus, Lucretia and Collatinus and The Wife of Hasdrubal and Her Children were originally part of a series of works depicting famous women of antiquity, probably commissioned by Ercole I d'Este's wife Eleanor of Aragon and referring back to the motto of her father, Ferdinand I of Naples: "Preferisco la morte al disonore" ('I prefer death to dishonor').

References

1490 paintings
Este collection
Paintings in the collection of the Kimbell Art Museum
Cultural depictions of Marcus Junius Brutus